Boogie is a 2021 American sports drama film written and directed by Eddie Huang in his directorial debut. It stars Taylor Takahashi, Taylour Paige, Pop Smoke, and Jorge Lendeborg Jr. The film marks the first and only acting film appearance by Pop Smoke before his death in February 2020. It was released on March 5, 2021, by Focus Features. The film received mixed reviews from critics and has grossed $4.3 million.

Premise 
A basketball phenom in Queens, New York, Alfred “Boogie” Chin struggles to balance the pressure from his traditional East Asian parents to earn a scholarship to an elite college over chasing his NBA dreams.

Cast

 Taylor Takahashi as Alfred “Boogie” Chin
 Taylour Paige as Eleanor
 Jorge Lendeborg Jr. as Richie
 Bashar Jackson as Monk
 Pamelyn Chee as Mrs. Chin
 Perry Yung as Mr. Chin
 Mike Moh as Melvin
 Alexa Mareka as Alissa
 Domenick Lombardozzi as Coach Hawkins
 Steve Coulter as Mr. Richmond
 Eddie Huang as Uncle Jackie
 Charlamagne tha God as Patrick

Production
In August 2019, it was announced Taylor Takahashi, Pamelyn Chee, and Jorge Lendeborg Jr. had joined the cast of the film, with Eddie Huang directing from a screenplay he wrote, with Focus Features distributing. In September 2019, Mike Moh, Dave East, Perry Yung, Alexa Mareka, Taylour Paige, and Domenick Lombardozzi joined the cast of the film.

Principal photography began August 2019 in the New York City sections of Queens and Manhattan. Filming lasted 26 days, also taking place in Flushing, New York.

Music
Credits adapted from Tidal.

Release
It was released on March 5, 2021.

Reception

Box office 
In the United States and Canada, Boogie made $430,000 from 1,252 theaters on its first day of release. It went on to debut to $1.2 million, finishing fifth at the box office. The film made $730,000 in its second weekend, remaining in fourth place.

Critical response 
Review aggregator Rotten Tomatoes reports an approval rating of 42% based on 81 reviews, with an average rating of 5.5/10. The website's critics consensus reads: "Boogie misses its shot with a contrived plot and uneven tone." According to Metacritic, which sampled 24 critics and calculated a weighted average score of 54 out of 100, the film received "mixed or average reviews". Audiences polled by CinemaScore gave the film an average grade of "C+" on an A+ to F scale, while PostTrak reported 70% of audience members gave it a positive score, with 55% saying they would definitely recommend it.

Teo Bugbee at The New York Times gave a mixed-to-positive review, writing "It's a competent movie, but it doesn't quite make it to the big leagues". Chris Vognar for the San Francisco Chronicle gave the film a "sitting Little Man", roughly translating to 3/5 stars, stating that it's "refreshing to see the rare Asian American drama on the big screen, but a lot of the conflict in Boogie, on the court and off, feels undercooked." Alison Willmore of Vulture gave a mixed-to-negative review, writing that the film's "ideas about Asian American identity and being Chinese in America are vague" and that "it regards Blackness with a roiling mixture of covetousness and resentment."

Robert Daniels at IndieWire rated the film 'D', stating that "Eddie Huang's coming-of-age sports drama uplifts the Asian American struggle while falling into the same othering it purports to despise".

References

External links

 
 

2021 films
2021 directorial debut films
2021 drama films
American basketball films
American coming-of-age drama films
Asian-American drama films
Hood films
Films about Chinese Americans
Films shot in New York City
Focus Features films
2020s coming-of-age drama films
2020s English-language films
2020s American films